There have been several Murray Baronetcies, all created in the Baronetage of Nova Scotia. Four of these baronetcies are extant.

Murray baronets, of Cockpool (19 July 1625 — 1658)
Sir Richard Murray, 1st Baronet (died 1636)
John Murray, 1st Earl of Annandale (died 1640)
James Murray, 2nd Earl of Annandale (died 1658) baronetcy dormant

Murray baronets, of Clermont, Fife (1 July 1626 — c.1700) 
Sir William Murray, 1st Baronet (died )  
Sir Mungo Murray, 2nd Baronet (died )  
Sir Mungo Murray, 3rd Baronet (died c. 1700) baronetcy dormant

Murray baronets, of Blackbarony, Peebles (15 May 1628 — ) 

Sir Archibald Murray, 1st Baronet (died )
Sir Alexander Murray, 2nd Baronet (died )  
Sir Archibald Murray, 3rd Baronet (died c. 1700)  
Sir Alexander Murray, 4th Baronet (died 31 December 1741)  
Sir William Murray, 5th Baronet (died c. 1760)  
Sir Richard Murray, 6th Baronet (died 4 October 1781)  
Sir Archibald Murray, 7th Baronet (c. 1726 – 23 June 1794)  
Sir John Murray, 8th Baronet (27 January 1766 – 30 August 1809)  
Sir Archibald Murray, 9th Baronet (3 August 1792 – 22 May 1860)  
Sir John Digby Murray, 10th Baronet (17 April 1798 – 8 May 1881)  
Sir Digby Murray, 11th Baronet (31 October 1829 – 5 January 1906)  
Sir John Digby Murray, 12th Baronet (12 January 1867 – 15 September 1938)  
Sir Kenelm Bold Murray, 13th Baronet (26 May 1898 – 16 August 1959)  
Sir Alan John Digby Murray, 14th Baronet (22 June 1909 – 9 May 1978) 
Sir Nigel Andrew Digby Murray, 15th Baronet (born 15 August 1944)

Murray baronets, of Elibank, Selkirk (16 May 1628 — )  
Sir Patrick Murray, 1st Baronet (died 1649) created Lord Elibank in 1643 
For subsequent baronets, see Lord Elibank.

Murray baronets, of Dunerne, Fife (20 April 1630 — )   
Sir William Murray, 1st Baronet (died )  
Sir William Murray, 2nd Baronet (died c. 1670)  
Sir William Murray, 3rd Baronet (died c. 1700)  
Sir William Murray, 4th Baronet (died c. 1730)  
Sir James Murray, 5th Baronet (died 14 February 1769)  
Sir Robert Murray, 6th Baronet (died 21 September 1771)  
Sir James Murray-Pulteney, 7th Baronet (c. 1755–26 Apr 1811)     
Sir John Murray, 8th Baronet (c. 1768 – 15 October 1827)  
Sir William Murray, 9th Baronet (c. 1769 – 14 May 1842)  
Sir James Pulteney Murray, 10th Baronet (c. 1814 – 20 February 1843)  
Sir Robert Murray, 11th Baronet (1 February 1815 – 15 April 1894)  
Sir William Robert Murray, 12th Baronet (19 October 1840 – 21 January 1904)  
Sir Edward Robert Murray, 13th Baronet (22 June 1875 – 14 January 1958)  
Rowland William Patrick Murray, presumed 14th Baronet (26 October 1910 – 1994)  
Rowland William Murray, presumed 15th Baronet (born 22 September 1947)

Murray baronets, of Stanhope, Peebles (1664)     
Sir William Murray, 1st Baronet (died )   
Sir David Murray, 2nd Baronet (died 14 February 1729)
Sir Alexander Murray, 3rd Baronet (c. 1684 – 18 May 1743) MP for Peebleshire 1710–1713    
Sir David Murray, 4th Baronet (died c. 1769) He was attainted and the baronetcy forfeited 1746

Murray baronets, of Ochtertyre, Perth (1673)      
Sir William Murray, 1st Baronet (30 October 1615 – 18 February 1681) 
Sir Patrick Murray, 2nd Baronet (21 January 1656 – 25 December 1735) 
Sir William Murray, 3rd Baronet (22 February 1682 – 20 October 1739) 
Sir Patrick Murray, 4th Baronet (21 August 1707 – 9 September 1764) 
Sir William Murray, 5th Baronet (23 October 1746 – 6 December 1800) 
Sir Patrick Murray, 6th Baronet FRSE (3 February 1771 – 1 June 1837) MP for Edinburgh 1806–1812    
Sir William Keith-Murray, 7th Baronet (19 July 1801 – 16 October 1861) 
Sir Patrick Keith-Murray, 8th Baronet (27 January 1835 – 10 January 1921)
Sir William Keith Murray, 9th Baronet (8 April 1872 – 4 February 1956)
Sir Patrick Ian Keith Murray, 10th Baronet (28 August 1904 – 18 June 1962) 
Sir William Patrick Keith Murray, 11th Baronet (7 September 1939 – 2 November 1977) 
Sir Patrick Ian Keith Murray, 12th Baronet (born 22 March 1965)

Murray baronets, of Melgund, Forfar (29 January 1704 — 6 February 1848) 
Sir Alexander Murray, 1st Baronet (2 August 1682 – 1713) 
Sir Alexander Murray, 2nd Baronet ( – 11 March 1736)  
Sir Joseph Murray, 3rd Baronet (6 August 1718 – 8 June 1802) 
Sir Albert Joseph Ghislain Murray, 4th Baronet (26 August 1774 – 6 February 1848) baronetcy dormant

References
. Retrieved 2008-02-14.

Baronetcies in the Baronetage of Nova Scotia
1625 establishments in Nova Scotia
Dormant baronetcies in the Baronetage of Nova Scotia
Forfeited baronetcies